Carlos Ortega (born 25 July 1989) is a Panamanian professional boxer who has been ranked as the world #1 mini-flyweight by the WBC.

Professional career

On August 23, 2014, Ortega defeated Leroy Estrada by twelfth round unanimous decision to win the vacant WBC Silver mini-flyweight title.

Professional boxing record

References

External links

1989 births
Living people
Mini-flyweight boxers
Light-flyweight boxers
Panamanian male boxers